
Gmina Obrazów is a rural gmina (administrative district) in Sandomierz County, Świętokrzyskie Voivodeship, in south-central Poland.

Villages
Gmina Obrazów contains the villages and settlements of Bilcza, Chwałki, Dębiany, Głazów, Jugoszów, Kleczanów, Komorna, Lenarczyce, Malice, Obrazów, Piekary, Rożki, Sucharzów, Świątniki, Święcica, Węgrce Panieńskie, Wierzbiny, Zdanów and Żurawica.

Neighbouring gminas
Gmina Obrazów is bordered by the town of Sandomierz and by the gminas of Dwikozy, Klimontów, Lipnik, Samborzec and Wilczyce.

References

Polish official population figures 2006

Obrazow
Sandomierz County